Easy to Love (surtitled The Piano of Roland Hanna) is an album by pianist Roland Hanna recorded in 1959 and released by the ATCO label early the following year.

Track listing
 "The Best Things in Life Are Free" (Ray Henderson, Buddy DeSylva, Lew Brown) – 4:03
 "Next Time You See Me" (Ben Tucker) – 5:04
 "From This Day On" (Leigh Harline, Mort Greene) – 4:38
 "Like Someone in Love" (Jimmy Van Heusen, Johnny Burke) – 4:27
 "Yesterdays" (Jerome Kern, Otto Harbach) – 4:09
 "Farouk Thelonious" (Tucker) – 3:40
 "It Never Entered My Mind" (Richard Rodgers, Lorenz Hart) – 4:03
 "Easy to Love" (Cole Porter) – 3:37
 "Night in Tunisia" (Dizzy Gillespie, Frank Paparelli) – 3:08

Personnel 
Roland Hanna – piano
Ben Tucker – bass
Roy Burnes – drums

References 

1960 albums
Atco Records albums
Roland Hanna albums
Albums produced by Nesuhi Ertegun